Ignis was an Italian professional cycling team that existed from 1954 to 1968. Its main sponsor was Italian home appliance maker Ignis. The team won the team classification of the 1960 Giro d'Italia.

References

External links

Cycling teams based in Italy
Defunct cycling teams based in Italy
1955 establishments in Italy
1968 disestablishments in Italy
Cycling teams established in 1955
Cycling teams disestablished in 1968